JDS Murasame (DD-107) was the lead ship of the  destroyer of Japan Maritime Self-Defense Force.

Construction and career 
Murasame was laid down by Mitsubishi at Kobe in Japan on 17 December 1957, launched on 31 July 1958 and commissioned with the pennant number DD-107 on 28 February 1959. She was incorporated into the Maizuru District Force.

On September 25, 1959, the 10th Escort Corps was reorganized under the 1st Escort Corps group.

On February 1, 1961, the 10th Escort Corps was reorganized into the 2nd Escort Group under the Self-Defense Fleet.

Participated in practicing ocean voyages in 1965 and 1967.

In September 1969, the sonar was replaced with SQS-4.

On March 15, 1969, the 10th Escort Corps was reorganized under the 3rd Escort Corps group.

In September 1975, the short torpedo launcher was removed and equipped with a 68-type triple short torpedo launcher.

On March 30, 1984, the 10th Escort Corps was abolished, the type was changed to a special service ship, and the ship registration number was changed to (ASU-7006). Transferred to Yokosuka as a ship under the direct control of the Development Guidance Group.

In 1987, mounted a new minesweeper under development by the Technical Research and Development Institute on the rear deck and engaged in practical tests.

She was decommissioned on March 23, 1988. The total itinerary is about 635,000 nautical miles (about 30 laps of the earth).

Gallery

Citations

References
 

Murasame-class destroyers (1958)
Ships built by Mitsubishi Heavy Industries
1958 ships